This is a list of things mentioned in the Quran. This list makes use of ISO 233 for the Romanization of Arabic words.

Supernatural 
 Allāh (" God")
 Names and attributes of Allah found in the Quran

Angels 
Malāʾikah (Angels):
 Angels of Hell
 Mālik (Guardian)
 Zabāniyah (Angels of punishment)
 Bearers of the Throne
 Harut and Marut
 Kirāman Kātibīn (Honourable Scribes)
 Atid
 Raqib
 Munkar and Nakir, who question the dead in the grave.

Archangels 
Archangels:
 Jibrīl (Gabriel, chief)
 Ar-Rūḥ,
 Ar-Rūḥ al-Amīn (The Trustworthy Spirit)
 Ar-Rūḥ al-Qudus (The Holy Spirit)
 Angel of the Trumpet (Isrāfīl or Raphael)
 Malakul-Mawt (Angel of Death, Azrael)
 Mika'il (Michael)

Jinn 
Jinn:
 ʿIfrīt (27:39)
 Jann
 Qarīn (43:36–38; 50:23–27)

Devils 
Shayāṭīn (Demons or Devils):
 Iblīs ash-Shayṭān (the (chief) Devil) (11 times)
 Mārid ("Rebellious one")

Others 
 Ghilmān or Wildān - perpetually youthful attendants (genderless)
 Ḥūr - pure companions  with beautiful eyes

Animals

Related 
 The cow of Israelites (baqarah)  
 The dhiʾb (wolf) that Jacob feared could attack Joseph
 The fīl (elephant) of the Abyssinians)
 Ḥimār (domesticated donkey)
 The hud-hud (hoopoe) of Solomon (27:20–28)
 The kalb (dog) of the sleepers of the cave (18:18–22)
 The namlah (female ant) of Solomon (27:18–19)
 The nāqat (she-camel) of Salih
 The nūn (fish or whale) of Jonah

Non-related 
 ʿAnkabūt (Female spider)
 Dābbat al-Arḍ (Beast of the Earth) (27:82)
 Ḥimār (Wild ass)
 Naḥl (Honey bee)
 Qaswarah ('Lion', 'beast of prey' or 'hunter')

Prophets 
Prophets (anbiyāʾ) or Messengers (rusul)

 Adam, the first human (25 times)
 Elisha (al-yasa)   38:48, 6:85-87
 Job (ayyūb) 
 David (dāwūd)  
dhūl-kifl  (2 times)
  Aaron (hārūn) (24 times)
Hud  (7 times)
 Enoch (idrīs)  
 Elijah  (ilyās) 
 Joachim (ʿimrān) (3:33, 3:35, 66:12) 
 Isaac (isḥāq) (17 times)
 Ishmael (ismāʿīl)  (12 times)
 Dhabih Ullah
 Lūṭ (Lot) (27 times)
Abraham (Ibrahim)
 Ṣāliḥ (9 times)
 Shuʿayb (Jethro, Reuel or Hobab?) (11 times)
 Sulaymān ibn Dāwūd (Solomon son of David) (17 times)
 ʿUzair (Ezra?)(9:30) 
 Yaḥyā ibn Zakariyyā  (John the Baptist the son of Zechariah) (5 times) 
 Ya‘qūb (Jacob) (16 times) 
 Yūnus (Jonah)
 Dhūn-Nūn ("He of the Fish (or Whale)" or "Owner of the Fish (or Whale)")
 Ṣāḥib al-Ḥūt ("Companion of the Whale")
 Yūsuf ibn Yaʿqūb  (Joseph son of Jacob) (27 times)
 Zakariyyā (Zechariah) (7 times)

ʾUlu al-ʿAzm 
"Those of the Perseverance and Strong Will" in reverse chronological order:
 Muhammad the final seal of the prophets()  (Muhammad is mentioned four times)
 Ahmad
 Other names and titles of Muhammad
 ʿĪsā ibn Maryam  (Jesus son of Mary)
 Al-Masīḥ  (The Messiah)
 Ibn Maryam (Son of Mary) 
 Child / Pure boy (9 times) 
 Guidance  possibly 22 times)
 Messenger / Prophet (5 times) 
 other terms and titles (14 times)
 Sign (4 times) 
 The Gift (1 time) 
 Mercy from God (1 time) 
 Servant (1 time) 
 Blessed (1 time) 
  (1 time)
 Amazing thing / Thing unheard of (1 time) 
 Example (1 time) 
 Straight Path / Right Way (1 time) 
 Witness (1 time) 
 His Name (1 time) 
 3rd person "He / Him / Thee" (48 times) 
 1st person "I / Me" (35 times) 
 Mūsā Kalīm Allāh ( Moses He who spoke to God)  (136 times)
 Ibrāhīm Khalīl Allāh (Abraham Friend of God)  (69 times)
 Nūḥ (Noah)  (43)

Debatable ones 
 Dhūl-Qarnain
 Luqmān
 Ṭālūt (Saul or Gideon?)

Implicitly mentioned 
 Irmiyā (Jeremiah)
 Ṣamūʾīl (Samuel)
 Yūshaʿ ibn Nūn (Joshua, companion and successor of Moses)
 Khidr, described but not mentioned by name in the Quran (18:65–82) 
 Shamʿūn (Arabic: شَمْعُون ٱبْن حَمُّون, Peter, apostle of Jesus Christ ('Isa ibn Maryam)

Contemporaries, relatives or followers of Prophets 
Aʿdāʾ (Enemies or foes), aṣḥāb (companions or friends), qurbā (kin), or followers of Prophets:

Good ones 
 Adam's immediate relatives
 Martyred son
 Wife
 Believer of Ya-Sin
 Family of Noah
 Mother Shamkhah bint Anush or Betenos
 People of Aaron and Moses
 Egyptians
 Believer (Asif ibn Barkhiya)
 Imraʾat Firʿawn (Āsiyá bint Muzāḥim or Wife of Pharaoh, who adopted Moses)
 Magicians of the Pharaoh
 Wise, pious man
 Moses' wife
 Moses' sister-in-law
 Mother
 Sister
 People of Abraham
 Mother Abiona or Amtelai the daughter of Karnebo
 Ishmael's mother
 Isaac's mother
 People of Jesus
 Disciples (including Peter)
 Mary's mother
 Zechariah's wife
 People of Joseph
 Brothers (including Binyāmin (Benjamin) and Simeon)
 Egyptians
 ʿAzīz ("Mighty One," that is Potiphar, Qatafir or Qittin)
 Malik (King, that is Ar-Rayyān ibn Al-Walīd)
 Wife of ʿAzīz (Zulaykhah)
 Mother
 People of Solomon
 Mother
 Queen of Sheba
 Vizier
 Zayd, Muhammad's adopted son

Evil ones 
 Āzar (possibly Terah)
 Father of Abraham
 Firʿawn (Pharaoh of Moses' time) (74 times)
 Hāmān
 Jālūt (Goliath)
 Qārūn (Korah, cousin of Moses) 
 As-Sāmirī (20:85, 20:87, 20:95)
 Abī Lahab
 Slayers of Salih's she-camel (Qaddar ibn Salif and Musda' ibn Dahr)

Implicitly or non-specifically mentioned 
 ʿImrān (Amram the father Mary)
 Abraha
 Bal'am or Balaam
 Barṣīṣā
 Caleb or Kaleb the companion of Joshua
 Luqman's son
 Nebuchadnezzar II
 Nimrod
 Rahmah the wife of Ayyub
 Shaddad

Groups

Mentioned 
 Aṣḥāb al-Jannah
 People of Paradise
 People of the Burnt Garden
 Aṣḥāb as-Sabt (Companions of the Sabbath)
 Christian apostles
 Ḥawāriyyūn (Disciples of Jesus)
 Companions of Noah's Ark
 Aṣḥāb al-Kahf war-Raqīm (Companions of the Cave and Al-Raqaim? or Petra? (18:9–22)
 Companions of the Elephant
 People of al-Ukhdūd
 People of a township in Surah Ya-Sin
 People of Yathrib or Medina
 Qawm Lūṭ (Folk of Lot, the people of Sodom and Gomorrah)
 Nation of Noah

Tribes, ethnicities or families 
 Aʿrāb (Arabs or Bedouins)
 ʿĀd (people of Hud)
 Companions of the Rass
 Qawm Tubbaʿ (People of Tubba')
 People of Sabaʾ or Sheba
 Quraysh
 Thamūd (people of Salih)
 Aṣḥāb al-Ḥijr ("Companions of the Stoneland")
 ʿAjam
 Ar-Rūm ( "The Romans")
 Banī Isrāʾīl (Children of Israel)
 Muʾtafikāt (The overthrown cities of Sodom and Gomorrah) (9:70 and 69:9)
 People of Ibrahim
 People of Ilyas
 People of Nuh
 People of Shuaib
 Ahl Madyan , People of Madyan)
 Aṣ-ḥāb al-Aykah ("Companions of the Wood")
 Qawm Yūnus (People of Jonah)
 Ahl al-Bayt ("People of the Household")
 Household of Abraham
 Brothers of Yūsuf
 Daughters of Abraham's nephew Lot
 Progeny of Imran
 Household of Moses
 Household of Muhammad ibn Abdullah ibn Abdul-Muttalib ibn Hashim
 Daughters of Muhammad
 Wives of Muhammad
 Household of Salih
 People of Fir'aun
 Current Ummah of Islam (Ummah of Muhammad)
 Aṣ-ḥāb Muḥammad (Companions of Muhammad)
 Anṣār (Muslims of Medina who helped Muhammad and his Meccan followers, literally 'Helpers')
 Muhājirūn (Emigrants from Mecca to Medina)
 Ḥizbullāh (Party of God)
 People of Mecca
 Wife of Abu Lahab
 Children of Ayyub
 Sons of Adam
 Wife of Nuh
 Wife of Lut
 Yaʾjūj wa Maʾjūj (Gog and Magog)
 Son of Nuh

Implicitly mentioned 
 Amalek
 Ahl as-Suffa (People of the Verandah)
 Banu Nadir
 Banu Qaynuqa
 Banu Qurayza
 Iranian peoples (or Iranic peoples)
 Umayyad Dynasty
 Aus & Khazraj
 People of Quba
 Abyssinian people

Religious groups 
 Ahl al-Dhimmah
 Kāfirūn (Disbelievers)
 Majūs (Zoroastrians)
 Munāfiqūn (Hypocrites)
 Muslims
 Believers
 Righteous ones
  Ahl al-Kitāb (People of the Book)
 Naṣārā (Christian(s)) or People of the Injil)
 Ruhban (Christian monks)
 Qissis (Christian priest)
 Yahūd (Jews)
 Ahbār (Jewish scholars)
 Rabbani/Rabbi
 Sabians
 Polytheists
 Meccan polytheists at the time of Muhammad
 Mesopotamian polytheists at the time of Abraham and Lot

Locations

Mentioned 
 Al-Arḍ Al-Muqaddasah ("The Holy Land")
 'Blessed' land
 In the Arabian Peninsula (excluding Madyan):
 Al-Aḥqāf ("The Sandy Plains," or "the Wind-curved Sand-hills")
 Iram dhāt al-ʿImād (Iram of the Pillars)
 Al-Madīnah (Yathrib
 ʿArafāt
 Al-Ḥijr (Hegra)
 Badr (The first battle of the muslims)
 Ḥunayn
 Makkah (Mecca)
 Al-Balad al-Amīn (the secure land)
 Bakkah (3:96)
 Ḥaraman Āminan ("Sanctuary (which is) Secure") (28:57; 29:67)
 Kaʿbah (Kaaba)
 Al-Bayt al-ʿAṭīq (the Ancient House) (22:29 – 33)
 Al-Bayt al-Ḥarām (5:97) the Sacred House)
 Maqām Ibrāhīm (Station of Abraham) (2:125) (3:98)
 Safa and Marwah (2:158)
 Umm al-Qurā ("Mother of the Townships")
 Sabaʾ (Sheba)
 ʿArim Sabaʾ (Dam of Sheba)
 Rass
 Al-Jannah (Paradise, literally "The Garden")
 Jahannam (Hell)
 In Mesopotamia:
 Al-Jūdiyy
 Munzalanm-Mubārakan ("Place-of-Landing (that is) Blessed")
 Bābil (Babylon)
 Qaryat Yūnus ("Township of Jonah," that is Nineveh)
 Door of Hittah
 Madyan (Midian)
 Majmaʿ al-Baḥrayn
 Miṣr (Mainland Egypt)
 Salsabīl (A river in Paradise)
 Sinai Region or Tīh Desert
 Al-Wād Al-Muqaddasi Ṭuwan (The Holy Valley of Tuwa)
 Al-Wādil-Ayman (The valley on the 'righthand' side of the Valley of Tuwa and Mount Sinai)
 Al-Buqʿah Al-Mubārakah ("The Blessed Place")
 Mount Sinai or Mount Tabor
 Al-Jabal ("The Mount")
 Aṭ-Ṭūr ("The Mount")
 Ṭūr Sīnāʾ
 Ṭūr Sīnīn

Religious locations 
 Bayʿa (Church)
 Miḥrāb
 Monastery
 Masjid (Mosque, literally "Place of Prostration")
 Al-Mashʿar Al-Ḥarām ("The Sacred Grove")
 Al-Masjid Al-Aqṣā (Al-Aqsa Mosque, literally "The Farthest Place-of-Prostration")
 Al-Masjid Al-Ḥarām (The Sacred Mosque of Mecca)
 Masjid Al-Dirar
 A Mosque in the area of Medina, possibly:
 Masjid Qubāʾ (Quba Mosque)
 The Prophet's Mosque
 Salat (Synagogue)

Implicitly mentioned 
 Antioch
 Antakya
 Arabia
 Al-Ḥijāz (literally "The Barrier")
 Black Stone (Al-Ḥajar al-Aswad) & Al-Hijr of Isma'il
 Cave of Hira
 Ghār ath-Thawr (Cave of the Bull)
 Hudaybiyyah
 Ta'if
 Ayla
 Barrier of Dhul-Qarnayn
 Bayt al-Muqaddas & 'Ariha
 Bilād ar-Rāfidayn (Mesopotamia)
 Canaan
 Cave of the Seven Sleepers
 Dār an-Nadwa
 Jordan River
 Nile River
 Palestine River
 Paradise of Shaddad

Plant matter 

Ajwa (عجوة) is a soft dry variety of date fruit from Saudi Arabia

Baṣal (Onion) (2:61)
Thum (ثوم, Garlic]] or wheat) (2:61)
Shaṭʾ (Shoot) (48:29)
Sūq (Plant stem) (48:29)
Zarʿ (Seed)

Fruits 
Ajwa (عجوة) is a soft dry variety of date fruit from Saudi Arabia

Fawākih or Thamarāt:
 ʿAnib (Grape) (17:91)
 Ḥabb dhul-ʿaṣf (Corn of the husk)
 Qith-thāʾ (Cucumber) (2:61)
 Rummān (Pomegranate)
 Tīn (Fig)
 Ukul khamṭ (Bitter fruit or food of Sheba)
 Zaytūn (Olive)
 In Paradise
 Forbidden fruit of Adam

Plants 
Shajar (Bushes, trees or plants):
 ʿAdas (Lentil) (2:61)
 Baql (Herb) (2:61)
 Plants of Sheba
 Athl (Tamarisk)
 Sidr (Lote-tree)
 Līnah (Tender Palm tree)
 Nakhl (Date palm)
 Rayḥān (Rosemary, Scented plant)
 Sidrat al-Muntahā
 Zaqqūm (A tree in Hell)

Holy books 
Islamic holy books:
 Al-Injīl (The Gospel of Jesus)
 Al-Qurʾān (The Book of Muhammad)
 Ṣuḥuf-i Ibrāhīm (Scroll(s) of Abraham)
 At-Tawrāt (The Torah, literally "The Law")
 Ṣuḥuf-i-Mūsā (Scroll(s) of Moses)
 Tablets of Stone
 Az-Zabūr (The Psalms of David)
 Umm al-Kitāb ( "Mother of the Book(s)")

Objects of people or beings 
 Heavenly Food of Christian Apostles
 Noah's Ark
 Staff of Moses
 Staff of Solomon
 Tābūt as-Sakīnah (Casket of Shekhinah)
 Throne of the Queen of Sheba
 Trumpet of Israfil

Mentioned idols (cult images) 
 'Ansāb
 Jibt and Ṭāghūt (False god)

Of Israelites 
 Baʿal
 The ʿijl (golden calf statue) of Israelites

Of Noah's people 
 Nasr
 Suwāʿ
 Wadd
 Yaghūth
 Yaʿūq

Of Quraysh 
 Al-Lāt
 Al-ʿUzzā
 Manāt

Celestial bodies 
Maṣābīḥ (literally 'lamps'):
 Al-Qamar (The Moon)
 Kawākib (Planets)
 Al-Arḍ (The Earth)
 Nujūm (Stars)
 Ash-Shams (The Sun)
 Ash-Shiʿrā (Sirius)

Liquids 
 Māʾ (Water or fluid)
 Nahr (River)
 Yamm (River or sea)
 Sharāb (Drink)

Events, incidents, occasions or times 
 Year of the Elephant
 Incident of Ifk
 Laylat al-Qadr (Night of the Power or Decree)
 Laylatinm-Mubārakatin (44:3)
 Mubahalah
 Sayl al-ʿArim (Flood of the Great Dam of Ma'rib in Sheba)
 The Farewell Pilgrimage (Hujjal-Wadaʿ)
 Treaty of Hudaybiyyah

Battles or military expeditions 
 Battle of al-Aḥzāb ("the Confederates")
 Battle of Badr
 Battle of Hunayn
 Battle of Khaybar
 Battle of Uhud
 Conquest of Mecca
 Expedition of Tabuk

Days 
 Al-Jumuʿah (The Friday)
 As-Sabt (The Sabbath or Saturday)
 Days of battles or military expeditions (see the above section)
 Days of Hajj
 Ayyāminm-Maʿdūdatin (2:203)
 Yawm al-Ḥajj al-Akbar (9:2)
 Doomsday

Months of the Islamic calendar 
12 months:
 Four holy months (2:189–217; 9:1–36)
 Ash-Shahr Al-Ḥarām (The Sacred or Forbidden Month) (2:194–217; 5:97)
 Ramaḍān (2:183–187)

Pilgrimages 
 Al-Ḥajj (The Greater Pilgrimage)
 Ḥajj al-Bayt ("Pilgrimage of the House") (2:158)
 Ḥijj al-Bayt ("Pilgrimage of the House") (3:97)
 Al-ʿUmrah (The Lesser Pilgrimage) (2:158–196)

Times for Prayer or Remembrance 
Times for Duʿāʾ ('Invocation'), Ṣalāh and Dhikr ('Remembrance', including Taḥmīd ('Praising'), Takbīr and Tasbīḥ):
 Al-ʿAshiyy (The Afternoon or the Night) (30:17–18)
 Al-Ghuduww (7:205–206)
 Al-Bukrah (48:9)
 Aṣ-Ṣabāḥ (30:17–18)
 Al-Layl (17:78–81; 50:39–40)
 Al-ʿIshāʾ (24:58)
 Aẓ-Ẓuhr (30:17–18)
 Aẓ-Ẓahīrah (24:58)
 Dulūk ash-Shams (17:78–81)
 Al-Masāʾ (30:17–18)
 Qabl al-Ghurūb (50:39–40)
 Al-Aṣīl (33:42; 48:9; 76:25–26)
 Al-ʿAṣr (103:1–3)
 Qabl ṭulūʿ ash-Shams (50:39–40)
 Al-Fajr (17:78–81; 24:58)

Implied 
 Event of Ghadir Khumm (5:67)
 Laylat al-Mabit (2:207)
 The first pilgrimage (48:27)

Others 

 Bayt (Home or House)
 Al-Bayt al-Maʿmūr
 Ḥunafāʾ
 Ṭāhā
 Ṭayyibah
 Zīnah, Adornment, beauty, beautiful thing or splendour)

See also 

 Biblical people in Islam
 Holiest sites in Islam
 Ḥ-R-M
 List of biblical names
 List of burial places of Abrahamic figures
 List of mosques that are mentioned by name in the Quran
 List of people in both the Bible and the Quran
 Muhammad in the Quran
 Names of God in Islam

Notelist

References

Individual

Grouped 

Characters and names
Quran
Qur'anic
 
Qur'anic names